Zeritis neriene, the checkered gem, is a butterfly in the family Lycaenidae. It is found in Senegal, The Gambia, Guinea, Burkina Faso, Sierra Leone, Ivory Coast, Ghana, Benin, Nigeria, southern Niger, Cameroon, the Central African Republic, southern Sudan, Uganda, and western Kenya. The habitat consists of savanna, where it is found on sandy soils and open stony ground with short grass.

Adults feed from small, white, low-growing flowers.

References

External links
Die Gross-Schmetterlinge der Erde 13: Die Afrikanischen Tagfalter. Plate XIII 69 h as (synonym) Cigaritis amine

Butterflies described in 1836
Aphnaeinae
Butterflies of Africa
Taxa named by Jean Baptiste Boisduval